The Blanowice Formation is a geologic formation in Częstochowa, Poland. It is late Pliensbachian-Lowermost Toarcian age. Plant fossils have been recovered from this formation. Along with the Drzewica Formation is part of the Depositional sequence IV-VII of the late lower Jurassic Polish Basin. Deposits of sequences IV, V, VI and VII make up the Blanowice Formation, being all four sequences are of Pliensbachian age, documented by megaspores (Horstisporites). On the upper strata, “sub-coal beds" cover the sequence VII-lower VIII (Pliensbachian-Toarcian transition), while the uppermost part of VIII is identified with the Ciechocinek Formation. The Blanowice Formation has been known for decades thanks to the abundant plant fossils and plant roots, but mostly due to the Blanowice Brown Coals, where the oldest Biomolecules found worldwide have been recovered. The Mrzygłód mine dinocyst assemblage is taxonomically undiversified, containing specimens that are good age indicators allowing relatively precise suggestion of its age. Luehndea spinosa, with a single recovered specimen spans between the Late Pliensbachian (Margaritaus) to the Lowermost Toarcian (Tenuicostatum). Other ocal dinocysts such as  Mendicodinium range Late Pliensbachian–Aalenian, a wider stratigraphic range. The lower part of the formation is coeval in age with the Gielniów Formation and Drzewica Formation (Southern and central Poland), Lobez Formation and Komorowo Formation (Pomerania), Olsztyn Formation (Baltic German-Polish transition), the lower part of the Rydeback Member of the Rya Formation (Southern Sweden), lower Fjerritslev or Gassum Formation (Danish Basin), lower and middle Sorthat Formation (Bornholm), Neringa Formation (Lithuania). The upper part is coeval with the lowermost upper Rydeback Member, upper Gassum Formation and lower Lava Formation (Lithuania).

Mining

The local Mesozoic brown Coal is composed by Lignite of Lower Jurassic age, known as the Blanowice Coal. Increased carbon-bearing capacity, locally present in the profile of the Upper Forest land sediments, was the basis for the development coal mining in this area in the years 1818–1959. The mining center at that time was concentrated in the vicinity of Poręba near Zawiercie, as well as in a dozen other towns (Sprawowice, Blanowice, Łazy, Siewierz). Its basis was shallow exploitation a coal seam with a thickness of up to 2.0 m.
Occurrence of Blanowice Coals in Jurassic outcrops between Częstochowa and Zawiercie was known for a long time. Already in the 1890s, they were mined on a small scale in the vicinity of Blanowice, being described since the start of the exploitation. After 1796 on Siewiersk was reported hard coal, the first outcrop of the main Blanowice Fm coal. The mining of Blanowice Coals developed specially in the 1920s and 1930s, where major discoveries were reported. This coals were exploited on small exploitations, where various minor mines recovered the coal seams.  The "Zygmunt" mine, operating at the turn of the 1920s and 1930s, was one of the largest. Annual production, as shown in official documents, it exceeded the total output from other mines many times.

Stratigraphy
The best lithological profile of the productive section of the Blanowice Formation was developed on the basis of the exposure in the trench made in Kierszula near Poręba. On this exposure, the major data of the Blanowice strata was recovered. The lower layers are above the Hettangian to Sinemurian Zagaje Formation. Mostly the local successions start with the Blanowice Formation, which rests with a large stratigraphic hiatus on Upper Triassic strata. While some terrestrial sediments maybe were deposited here during Hettangian–Sinemurian, but removed during the Late Sinemurian. From the upper part is developed an initial level of up to 0.61 m thick, where there are clay deposits separated by a layer of Sandstone, mostly carbonaceous with numerous plant detritus, with a total thickness of 1.82 m. At 2.43 m of depth, a shoal of slightly weathered coal, and below, at a distance of 0.62 m - a coal layer of 1.09 m thick, where the contact of the coal with the surrounding rocks is clearly marked. This strata is laminated separating series of layers with anthracoliths, characterized by an abundance of plant detritus. Near the floor of this section, the amount of sand increases and there are sections with transition into Mud, and even Sandstone. At the bottom, with a depth of 4.75 m a  major layer of clay is present, which in the lower section is characterized by an abundance of plant detritus. Finally, on the Kierszula pit, under the bottom surface of the coal seam and the accompanying shoal, fragments of root plants arranged most often in the position of their growth were found. These formations, up to 6.0 cm in length and up to 0.4 cm in thickness, mark the levels of the "root soil" that document the autochthonous and Tracolite genesis. The upper part of the formation is dominated by alluvial and Lacustrine/Backswamp sand and coal-bearing sediments.

Sedimentological Evolution

The Blanowice Formation belong to the Częstochowa region of the sedimentological groups of the lower Jurassic Poland. This formation starts with the Sequence V, that along the Sequence VI form a very thin layer on the local strata, being absent from some places such as the Włodowice 52 BN borehole. Both sequences are locally very difficult to distinguish, as in places like the Wrêczyca 3/81 borehole the 2 along the VII are part of a series of amalgamated alluvial—meandering river deposits. Between the towns of Gmina Łęka Opatowska and Wrêczyca both V and VI represent alluvial—meandering river deposits and between Suliszowice and Parkoszowice is found a more wide diversity of the deposits origin, from deltaic-lagoonal in the Suliszowice 38 BN borehole to alluvial facies occur in Żarki 89 Ż borehole and again deltaic facies occur in Jaworznik 132 Ż borehole and the Parkoszowice 58 BN borehole.

On the Sequence VII, between Gmina Łęka Opatowska and Bolesławiec appear abundant coal-bearing deposits with numerous palaeosol horizons deposited by a lacustrine/backswamp depositional system. The coal deposits had a thickness of about 6 m on the Bolesławiec 6 borehole, which represents mostly terrestrial-derived strata. A similar coal-bearing lacustrine strata is found on the coeval Włodowice 52 BN borehole and in the major Parkoszowice 58 BN borehole, the most important recovered locally. The coal-bearing lacustrine strata is derived from the edges of the major local embayments, related with the coeval embayments-lagoonal settings, that are mostly recovered from the  Nowa Wieś 12 borehole, the SE Suliszowice 38 BN borehole, Żarki 89 Ż borehole, Jaworznik 132 Ż borehole and finally on the Włodowice 52 BN is rcovered a temporal frontal embayment. This marine boreholes had a similar nearshore facies across the boundaries of the sequences, and several fossils recovered point to a nearby connection with the Tethys Ocean at the south of the formation. The local Coal Bearing facies corresponds to the major flooding surface found on the depositional sequence VII. Near the own town of Częstochowa, on Wrêczyca there are abundant deposits from amalgamated alluvial facies (meandering river), that appear on the sequences V, VI and VII indicates persistent alluvial sedimentation through Pliensbachian times, that is referred to the local “Wrêczyca River”. On the Toarcian, a major local transgression  correlated with the Early Toarcian sea-level rise clearly recognized in Western Europe, the Silesian-Cracow area was encroached by the sea from the Polish Trough from the north and northeast, which resulted in the termination of alluvial sedimentation of the underlying uppermost part of the Blanowice Formation.

Biota
The Blanowice Formation recovers a deltaic section on the eastern Bohemian Massif, where rivers come from the west, as proven by the Carboniferous fossil matter found on the layers of the formation, moved from the west of the Czech Republic, and deposited especially on the Parkoszowice borehole. The Borehole was part of southeastern part of the Polish Basin that during the Early Jurassic, where developed a shallow paralic environment, with organic carbon buried in nearshore marine environments due to intensified erosion. This Borehole shows enhanced biomass contribution from aquatic algae groups (Haptophyta, unicellular Rhodophyta and several marcoalgae), with measured proliferation of aquatic algae groups during the local parasequence “f”, documented by increased abundances of 4-Methyldiasterenes, what proves a more marine influence than on other coeval boreholes, such as the Brody-Lubienia. There is also abundance on Parkoszowice show of 4Me-diasterenes with 28 carbon atoms, that are related with synthesized by methane oxidizing bacteria. Methanotrophs commonly occur in environments where methane is produced, and implicates the presence of local Wetlands, Marsh and Lagoon environments. It was proven that the formation was mostly Deltaic, alluvial and lacustrine, with increased marine influence on the Toarcian strata.

Coals

The Blanowice Formation Brown Coals (Blanowice Coals) are part of the Łęka Coal Basin, and had been known since 1800 from its abundant deposits, where younger material has been suggested as redeposited from this deposits. In the Early Jurassic the Blanowice Beds were  surrounded by land to the north, east and south making that terrestrial area the source of its sediments, that were deposited on a Nearshore Parallic Coal. This coals are present especially on the upper part of the formation, dominated by alluvial and lacustrine/backswamp sand and coal-bearing sediments. The organic matter found associated with the local Coal includes the oldest known Biomolecules (On the Mrzygłód clay-pit), that are composed by Labdanoic Acid, Ferruginol, Sugiol and 7-Oxototarol. The extracted  samples were recovered at the Wysoka Lelowska 47Ż borehole and Jaworznik 124Ż borehole, with  five core samples were taken from Żarki 90Ż drill core, this last coming from a relatively large, ~ 1.5 m thickness, coal seam. The random reflectance (%Rr) of the coals is 0.47–0.56, indicating a subbituminous coal rank. The geochemical data suggest the low degree of thermal maturation of the samples, where the polar fractions are dominant in all samples, typical for immature sediments.  Hopane isomers (that can be used for estimation of the organic matter maturity) are in relatively high amounts in all samples taken, suggesting immature character.  This is also confirmed by the occurrence of unstable biomolecules in the coal samples, including Labdanoic Acid, Ferruginol, Sugiol, Oxototarol, Sitosterol and Cholesterol.

These coals are generally dominated by Vitrain macerals, with exceptions where there is a great percentage of Inertinite. This led to interpretation as a result of wildfire or peat fire activity, confirmed by the co-occurrence of charcoal fragments. Sesquiterpenoids and Diterpenoids were also recovered from the coal, common in Conifers as well as in other plants such as angiosperms and bryophytes.  Vitrinite has local reflectance values of 0.49-0.56 %Ro. The Cupressaceae and/or Podocarpaceae families are considered the main peat-forming plant species (Due to the presence of phenolic Abietanes and dehydroabietic acids). Posterior revision of the Lignites of the Brown Coals had revealed a major distribution of Benzohopane derivatives in these coals and surrounding sandstones, that implicate probable differences in the degree of Biodegradation, and also a low Coalification range, typical of Lignites. Later largers studies cover a really big influence of the fires on the region.

After the Toarcian Anoxic Event on the called "Kaszewy-1" (where the Toarcian makes  ~150 m of the strata) the Wildfire activity was widely recorded. The Structure of the main depositional setting has been seen divided in 3 parts: on the center, near Kaszewy Kościelne there was a major restricted brackish-marine basin, with seasonal influxes of marine water. The great abundance of Charcoal is the main indicator of the fire activity locally, but also the Polycyclic Aromatic Hydrocarbons, whose abundance reflects an increase in wildfire activity. Coarse Charcoal particles abundance is low, while the fine Charcoal particles are more abundant on nearly all the measured samples, vinculated to small reductions of the Sea Level locally. The most abundant Polycyclic Hydrocarbon found locally is Phenanthrene, and along the Charcoal data shows how the Fires locally increased around the Carbon Isotope Excursion on the Toarcian Anoxic Event Worldwide. Along this period, mostly of the strata of the region shows at least 6 periods of fire intensification, that are coeval to others found on Yorkshire, Wales and Peniche.

Dinoflagellates
On the Mrzygłód mine samples there is a domain of  land-derived Phytoclasts and Palynomorphs, with abundance of the cyst Nannoceratopsis, that is considered a euryhaline genus. High amount of terrestrial organic matter shows that there was an intense supply and accumulation of land-derived organic particles from surrounding land areas, what, along with the decrease of salinity conditions, thanks to the dinocysts conclude that the assemblage represents a part of the  Blanowice Formation deposited in a proximal area under brackish conditions, with possible changes on the range of salinity.

Palynology
The Blanowice Beds are distributed in area between Częstochowa, Dębnik, Siewierz and Olkusz in the Silesian - Cracow Monocline. The coals were mined there in the years 1818-1959. The major plant bearing strata is exposed at Kierszuła near Poręba, where an identified spore-pollen assemblage comprises higher cryptogamic plants (Bryopsida, Selaginellopsida, Sphenopsida, Lycopsida, Pteropsida) and the gymnospermous (Pteridospermopsida, Cycadopsida, Bennettitales, Ginkgoaceae, Coniferopsida). The Pollen of coniferous plants has been seen as connected with the Cheirolepidiaceae group, on an assemblage of herbaceous peat-bog vegetation, characterized by predominance of ferns, was most probably the parent material for that variety of coals. The presence of fairly thick laminae of Vitrain in the Kierszuła middle layers indicates some phases with share of forest assemblage marked in area of contemporary peat-bog.

Fossil Wood
The Blanowice Coals fossil wood from Zawiercie area were already described in 1917 as “Blanowicer Keuperholz”, on the basis of specimens from the “Elka”, “Kamilla” and “Zygmunt” coal pits, claimed to be xylologically similar, yet no taxon was named and the collection was not preserved. Based on recent revisions of the local flora, likely belong to Agathoxylon.

Plant Remains
Upper Pliensbachian strata on the Zawiercie area (Upper Silesia) is the main source for the Blanowice Formation Flora. Coal was mined locally during the 19th and early 20th centuries. Rutkowski (1923) found only three specimens of plants on waste heaps there, that where never properly described or illustrated, came from shale above the coal seam. Along with the Plant remains also noted plant detritus and coalified wood fragments. According to information from local miners, fossil plant specimens were discovered only rarely during coal extraction.

Fungi

Ichnofossils

Annelida

Bivalvia

References 

Geologic formations of Poland
Jurassic System of Europe
Pliensbachian Stage
Toarcian Stage
Sandstone formations
Mudstone formations
Alluvial deposits
Deltaic deposits
Shallow marine deposits
Ichnofossiliferous formations
Fossiliferous stratigraphic units of Europe
Paleontology in Poland